Aberdare West is a local government community in Rhondda Cynon Taf, Wales. The community was formed in 2016 when the former community of Aberdare was split into two. Neighbouring Aberdare East includes the main town of Aberdare.

Community
The Aberdare West community came into effect on 1 December 2016 following the enactment of The Rhondda Cynon Taf (Communities) Order 2016. The area includes the populated areas of Cwmdare, Trecynon and Robertstown as well as the more rural area surrounding the River Dare, west of Aberdare.

According to the 2021 UK Census Aberdare West had a population of 7,973. 98.3% described their ethnicity as white.

Governance
Aberdare West is included in the electoral ward of Aberdare West/Llwydcoed electing three county councillors to Rhondda Cynon Taf County Borough Council since 1995.

References

External links
 

Communities in Rhondda Cynon Taf
Aberdare